Washington Galleries Bus Station is located in the town of Washington in Tyne and Wear. The bus station was originally constructed in 1970s, to serve the adjacent Galleries Shopping Centre, which opened in 1974.

The original bus station was demolished and re-built in the late 2000s, as part of a £2.5 million refurbishment project. The new facility opened in October 2008.

Washington Galleries is served by Go North East's local bus services, with frequent routes running in and around Washington, as well as County Durham, Gateshead, Newcastle upon Tyne and Sunderland. The bus station has six departure stands (lettered A–F), each of which is fitted with seating, next bus information displays, and timetable posters. 

, the stand allocation is:

See also 

 Galleries Shopping Centre

References

External links 

 

Bus stations in Tyne and Wear
Washington, Tyne and Wear